The Denominazione Comune Italiana (DCIT), or "Common Italian Denomination/Name" in English, is the formal Italian generic name for a drug.

See also
 International Nonproprietary Name (INN)
 Dénomination Commune Française (DCF)
 United States Adopted Name (USAN)
 British Approved Name (BAN)
 Australian Approved Name (AAN)
 Japanese Accepted Name (JAN)

References

Naming conventions
Pharmacological classification systems

it:Denominazione comune internazionale